Gas Company Tower is a 52-story,  class-A office skyscraper on Bunker Hill in downtown Los Angeles, California. Located on the north side of Fifth Street between Olive Street and Grand Avenue, across from the Biltmore Hotel, the building serves as the headquarters for the Southern California Gas Company, which vacated its previous offices on Eighth- and Flower-streets in 1991, and is home to the Los Angeles offices of Arent Fox and Sidley Austin.

In 2014, Deloitte became the first tenant to have their logo affixed to the peak of the building which had been left plain since the building was completed. This giant accounting firm moved from nearby Two California Plaza, where it had been since 2000.

In popular culture
The lobby is featured in the opening scene of the 1994 action movie Speed.

See also

List of tallest buildings in Los Angeles
List of tallest buildings in the United States

References

External links
Gas Company Tower  at Skidmore, Owings and Merrill

Buildings and structures in Downtown Los Angeles
Bunker Hill, Los Angeles
Headquarters in the United States
Skyscraper office buildings in Los Angeles
Deloitte
Skidmore, Owings & Merrill buildings
Brookfield Properties buildings
Office buildings completed in 1991